Collège Sainte-Marie was a college in Montreal, Quebec, Canada. It ceased to exist in 1969, when it was merged into UQAM (Université du Québec à Montréal).

History
Collège Ste-Marie was founded by Jesuits in 1848. It had an English sector, which called the school St. Mary's College but later became separate in 1896 as Loyola College. Ste-Marie never issued degrees. It relied on its affiliation with chartered universities to grant degrees but had full curriculum control. Ste-Marie was originally affiliated with Université Laval until 1920, when it was affiliated with Université de Montréal. The college originally offered secondary education as well as collegial studies.

Church

A portion of the original college remains as the Église du Gesù (Church of Gesu, named after the church where St. Ignatius of Loyola is buried), which was originally the college chapel. Built in 1865 and designed by Irish architect Patrick Keely, it is one of the oldest religious buildings in Montreal. Also housed in the structure is the Salles du Gesù, Montreal's oldest theatre.

Notable alumni
Leo Dandurand
Marcel Dubé
Louis-Philippe de Grandpré, former puisne justice of the Supreme Court of Canada
Arthur Farrell
André Laurendeau
Georges-Raoul-Léotale-Guichart-Humbert Saveuse de Beaujeu
Léon-Mercier Gouin
Lucien L'Allier
Jean Prévost
Joseph Royal
Paul Sauvé
Guy Sylvestre, Jean-Guy Sylvestre, former head of the National Library of Canada
Charles-Émile Trudeau
Arthur Turcotte
Yves Fortier (lawyer)

Notable faculty
François-Maximilien Bibaud
Adélard Joseph Boucher
Joseph-A. Fowler
Jean-Baptiste Labelle

See also
 List of Jesuit sites

References

Bibliography
L'Encyclopédie de l'histoire du Québec / The Quebec History Encyclopedia - Collège Sainte-Marie, Montréal
Cinq-Mars, Jean. Histoire du Collège Sainte-Marie de Montréal, 1848-1969. Montréal : Hurtubise HMH, 1998. 516 p. : ill. ; 23 cm. 
Université de Montréal - Division des archives - Collège Sainte-Marie (Montréal) (three images)

External links
Association des anciens élèves du collège Sainte-Marie (The college's alumni association)
Salles du Gesù
The Church of Le Gesù de Montréal

Colleges in Quebec
Université du Québec à Montréal
Sainte-Marie
Defunct universities and colleges in Canada
Downtown Montreal
Buildings and structures demolished in 1975
Demolished buildings and structures in Montreal